Jordan Murphy (born 14 January 1988) is an English actor.

Career
Murphy is perhaps best known for his role as Arnold "Chop" Peters on the E4 teen comedy-drama series My Mad Fat Diary (2013–2015). He has also appeared in series such as The Project, Casualty, The Bill, and Doctor Who. In 2012, he appeared in the film Spike Island.

Filmography

References

External links
 

Living people
English male television actors
English male film actors
English male child actors
1988 births